Loo (written 盧/卢 as a Han character) may refer to these people:

Painting 
 Charles-Amédée-Philippe van Loo (1719–1795), French painter of allegorical scenes and portraits
 Charles-André van Loo (1705–1765), French subject painter
 Jean-Baptiste van Loo (1684–1745), French subject and portrait painter
 Louis-Michel van Loo (1707–1771), French painter

Sport 
 Alexa Loo (born 1972), Canadian snowboarder 
 Katrin Loo (born 1991), Estonian footballer
 Loo Hor-Kuay, Taiwanese Olympic basketball player
 Martin Loo (born 1988), Estonian cross-country mountain biker
 Rudolf Loo (1902–1983), Estonian amateur wrestler

Other 
 Ellen Joyce Loo (1986–2018), member of the Hong Kong musical group at17
 Raine Loo (born 1945), Estonian actress 
 Richard Loo (1903–1982), Chinese American film actor

Dutch-language surnames
Estonian-language surnames